Yaşım Çocuk is Turkish pop and rock singer Mabel Matiz's second studio album, which was released on 5 January 2013 in Turkey. Album was published in Turkey.

Track listing

References

External links 
 

Mabel Matiz albums
2013 albums